Klang–Banting Highway, Federal route 5, is a highway that connects Klang in the north with the town of Banting in the south. It is also known as Jalan Langat or Persiaran Tengku Ampuan Rahimah.

List of junction and towns 

Highways in Malaysia